Holiday Spirits is the debut studio album by the men's a cappella singing group Straight No Chaser. It was released in the US in 2008 on Atlantic Records. It peaked at No. 46 on the U.S. Billboard 200.

Track listing

Chart performance

Certifications

Release history

References

Straight No Chaser (group) albums
2008 Christmas albums
2008 debut albums
A cappella Christmas albums
Atlantic Records albums
Christmas albums by American artists